The Giant Buddhas is a documentary film by Swiss filmmaker Christian Frei about the destruction of the Buddhas of Bamyan in Afghanistan. It was released in March 2006. The movie quotes local Afghans that the destruction was ordered by Osama Bin Laden and that initially, Mullah Omar and the Afghans in Bamyan had opposed the destruction.

Awards and nominations
DOK Leipzig 2005: Silver Dove
Dokufest Prizren 2006: first prize ex aequo
Trento Film Festival 2006: Silver Gentian
Tahoe/Reno International Film Festival 2006: Best of the Fest - Documentary
Sundance Film Festival 2006: nominated for a Grand Jury Prize for World cinema-documentaries
Swiss Film Prize 2006: nominated for the Swiss Film Prize for Best Documentary
Toronto International Film Festival 2005: Official Selection

References

External links 
 "The Giant Buddhas" trilingual site (English, Deutsch, Français)
 

2005 films
Swiss documentary films
Buddhist media
Islam-related controversies in Asia
2005 documentary films
Films directed by Christian Frei
Documentary films about jihadism
Documentary films about Afghanistan
Documentary films about Buddhism